Yeshurun Hall is an indoor basketball hall in Netanya, Israel and the home of Elitzur Ironi Netanya. Nicknamed "HaKufsal", it has a capacity of 1,000.

The hall has also been used for the Maccabiah Games.

References

Basketball venues in Israel
Indoor arenas in Israel
Netanya
Sports venues in Northern District (Israel)